Ahmet Muhamedbegović (born 30 October 1998) is an Austrian professional footballer who plays as a centre-back for Slovak Super Liga club Dunajská Streda.

Club career

SKN St. Pölten
He made his Austrian Football Bundesliga debut for SKN St. Pölten on 17 December 2016 in a game against Admira Wacker Mödling.

In July 2018, he moved to 2. Liga club SKU Amstetten on a one-year cooperation deal. During his stint there, he made 22 league appearances. For the 2019–20 season, he returned to St. Pölten. Through five seasons, Muhamedbegović made 64 appearances in the Austrian Bundesliga for the Lower Austrians, in which he scored three goals. At the end of the 2020–21 season, St. Pölten suffered relegation from the Bundesliga, after which Muhamedbegović left the club after five years.

Dunajská Streda
On 20 July 2021, Muhamedbegović signed a two-year contract with Fortuna Liga club DAC Dunajská Streda.

References

1998 births
Living people
Austrian people of Bosnia and Herzegovina descent
Austrian footballers
SKN St. Pölten players
Austrian Football Bundesliga players
Association football central defenders
FC DAC 1904 Dunajská Streda players
Slovak Super Liga players
SKU Amstetten players
2. Liga (Austria) players
Austrian expatriate footballers
Expatriate footballers in Slovakia
Austrian expatriate sportspeople in Slovakia
People from Gänserndorf District
Footballers from Lower Austria